Arcticiflavibacter is a Gram-negative, aerobic and rod-shaped genus of bacteria from the family of Flavobacteriaceae with one known species (Arcticiflavibacter luteus).

References

Flavobacteria
Bacteria genera
Monotypic bacteria genera
Taxa described in 2016